Owtar (also Romanized as Owtār; also known as Ūtār Maḩalleh-ye Ḩavīq) is a village in Haviq Rural District, Haviq District, Talesh County, Gilan Province, Iran. At the 2006 census, its population was 462, in 108 families.

References 

Populated places in Talesh County